Full Moon in New York (also known as Ren zai Niu Yue) is a 1989 American and Hong Kong drama film directed by Stanley Kwan and produced by Henry Fong. This film has been music composed by Hung-Yi Chang.The film starring Sylvia Chang, Maggie Cheung, I-Chen Ko, Josephine Koo, John Reidy, and Gaowa Siqin in the lead roles.

Cast
 Sylvia Chang
 Maggie Cheung
 I-Chen Ko
 Josephine Koo
 John Reidy
 Gaowa Siqin
 Luke Valerio
 Linda Wang
 Vincent J. Mazella
 Charlie Sara

References

External links
 
 
 Full Moon in New York at timeout.com
 Full Moon in New York at hkmdb.com

1989 films
1980s English-language films
1980s Mandarin-language films
1980s Cantonese-language films
1989 drama films
American drama films
Hong Kong drama films
Films with screenplays by Ah Cheng
1989 multilingual films
American multilingual films
Hong Kong multilingual films
1980s American films
1980s Hong Kong films